The 1968–71 Nordic Football Championship was the tenth tournament staged. Four Nordic countries participated: Denmark, Finland, Norway and Sweden. Sweden won the tournament, its eighth Nordic Championship win.

Results

1968

1969

1970

1971

Table
The table is compiled by awarding two points for a victory, one point for a draw, and no points for a loss.

Winners

Statistics

Goalscorers

See also
Balkan CupBaltic CupCentral European International CupMediterranean Cup

References

External links
RSSSF archives

1968
1968–69 in European football
1969–70 in European football
1970–71 in European football
1968 in Swedish football
1969 in Swedish football
1970 in Swedish football
1971 in Swedish football
1968 in Danish football
1969 in Danish football
1970 in Danish football
1971 in Danish football
1968 in Norwegian football
1969 in Norwegian football 
1970 in Norwegian football 
1971 in Norwegian football
1968 in Finnish football
1969 in Finnish football
1970 in Finnish football
1971 in Finnish football